Joseph Richard Johnson (born October 30, 1961) is an American former right-handed starting pitcher in Major League Baseball who played for the Atlanta Braves and Toronto Blue Jays from 1985 to 1987.

Career
A native of Brookline, Massachusetts, Johnson attended the University of Maine. In 1981, he played collegiate summer baseball with the Yarmouth–Dennis Red Sox of the Cape Cod Baseball League and was named a league all-star. Johnson was drafted by the Atlanta Braves in the second round of the 1982 MLB Draft. He made his debut with the Braves in 1985, compiling a record of 4–4 with a 4.10 earned-run average. He had a solid 1986 season, going 13–9 with both the Braves and the Toronto Blue Jays, to whom he was traded on July 6 for fellow pitcher Jim Acker.

Johnson had a subpar 1987 in Toronto, and was featured in a Sports Illustrated article for their "One Day in Baseball" issue. An issue entirely focused on each of the Major League Baseball games of June 21, 1987 where a sportswriter was assigned to each game played that day and had to write an article about their day, whether it be action in the field or in the stands. While some features included a fan catching his first foul ball, coverage from inside the Green Monster in Fenway Park, a rare inside the park grand slam in Oakland. For the Toronto game, a sportswriter spent the day with Johnson, the scheduled starting pitcher for that day, and his family. Johnson had been struggling for the Blue Jays that year and in the game gave up three runs in three innings raising his ERA for the season to 5.13, but avoided the loss as the Blue Jays came back to win the game 7–6. Johnson was sent down to the minors after the game. It was expected to be a short term demotion so that he could work on his mechanics, but it turned out to be the last time he would ever pitch in the majors. He remained in the minor leagues until 1990 when he retired.

References

External links

1961 births
Living people
American expatriate baseball players in Canada
Atlanta Braves players
Baseball players from Massachusetts
Edmonton Trappers players
Greenville Braves players
Maine Black Bears baseball players
Major League Baseball pitchers
Pawtucket Red Sox players
Sportspeople from Brookline, Massachusetts
Richmond Braves players
Savannah Braves players
Syracuse Chiefs players
Toronto Blue Jays players
Yarmouth–Dennis Red Sox players